The Pibor massacre occurred in Pibor County, South Sudan from 23 December 2011 to 4 January 2012. The fighting was between the Murle and the Lou Nuer, mostly over raiding cattle and abducting children to raise as their own. The Nuer White Army released a statement stating its intention to "wipe out the entire Murle tribe on the face of the earth as the only solution to guarantee long-term security of Nuer’s cattle". A report by the United Nations Mission in South Sudan estimated that about 900 were killed. Joshua Konyi, the commissioner of Pibor County and a Murle, estimated that 2,182 women and children and 959 men were killed, 1,293 children were abducted and 375,186 cows were stolen.

See also
Bor massacre
2014 Bentiu massacre

References

2011 in South Sudan
2012 in South Sudan
December 2011 events in Africa
History of South Sudan
January 2012 events in Africa
Jonglei State
Massacres in 2011
Massacres in 2012
Massacres in South Sudan